This article is a list of cabinets of Slovenia, the chief executive body of the Republic of Slovenia. Unlike the President of Slovenia, who is directly elected, the Prime Minister of Slovenia is appointed by the National Assembly and must control a parliamentary majority there in order to govern successfully, even though it is judicially allowed to govern with a minority cabinet.

Since 1990, Slovenia has had 13 governments. The government is formed by political parties that are elected on democratic elections every four years, except if preliminary elections are determined to be held, which has happened two times since the independence. Slovenia has had in total of nine prime ministers, nine men and one woman, since 1990.

Statistics

The longest serving Prime Minister to date was Janez Drnovšek who held the post for 10 years and 45 days (3,695 days) between the years 1992 and 2002, followed by Janez Janša who ruled for 5 years and 28 days (2,584 days). He also holds the longest uninterrupted mandate of 2,180 days, between the years 2004 and 2008. The shortest term is held by Andrej Bajuk, who was on position for 176 days. Alenka Bratušek is the first woman to take the position of the Prime Minister of Slovenia and until now the only one to do so. The first minority cabinet was led by Borut Pahor in 2012 as two coalition parties: Zares and DeSUS left the coalition. The first preliminary elections followed just a few months after the break up of the coalition. Since then Slovenia witnessed another preliminary elections in 2014, when Janša's second cabinet broke up after DeSUS and DL, left the coalition and the cabinet found itself in minority.

Current government

The 15th Government of Slovenia was sworn on 1 June 2022. It is headed by Prime Minister Robert Golob.

See also

Prime Minister of Slovenia
Government of Slovenia

External links
Official website of the Slovenian Government
Chronology of Slovenian cabinets at vlada.si 

 
Slovenia, Prime Minister of
Cabinet
 
Prime Ministers